"Liebe ist" is a song by German recording artist Nena. It was co-written and produced along by Uwe Fahrenkrog-Petersen for her 13th studio album, Willst du mit mir gehn (2005). Selected as the album's lead single, it served as the theme song for the Sat.1 telenovela Verliebt in Berlin. Upon its release in February 2005, "Liebe ist" topped the German Singles Chart for two weeks, becoming Nena's second number-one hit, after 1983's "99 Luftballons", and her first chart-topper as a solo artist. The Bundesverband Musikindustrie (BVMI) awarded the song a gold certification for shipping 150,000 units in Germany alone. A remix of "Liebe ist" for American audiences was considered but never surfaced.

Formats and track listings

Charts

Weekly charts

Year-end charts

Certifications

References

External links
 "Liebe ist" at the official Nena website
 

2005 singles
2005 songs
Nena songs
Number-one singles in Germany
Songs written by Jörn-Uwe Fahrenkrog-Petersen
Warner Records singles